The Vespertilioninae  are a subfamily of vesper bats from the family Vespertilionidae.

Classification
Subfamily Vespertilioninae
Tribe Antrozoini
Genus Antrozous
Pallid bat, Antrozous pallidus
Genus Bauerus
Van Gelder's bat, Bauerus dubiaquercus
Genus Rhogeessa - Rhogeessa bats
Yucatan yellow bat, Rhogeessa aenea
Allen's yellow bat, Rhogeessa alleni
Bickham's yellow bat, Rhogeessa bickhami
Genoways's yellow bat, Rhogeessa genowaysi
Slender yellow bat, Rhogeessa gracilis
Husson's yellow bat, Rhogeessa hussoni
Thomas's yellow bat, Rhogeessa io
Menchu's yellow bat, Rhogeessa menchuae
Tiny yellow bat, Rhogeessa minutilla
Least yellow bat, Rhogeessa mira
Northern little yellow bat, Rhogeessa parvula
Nicaraguan little yellow bat, Rhogeessa permutandis
Black-winged little yellow bat, Rhogeessa tumida
Ecuadorian little yellow bat, Rhogeessa velilla
Tribe Eptesicini
Genus Arielulus
Bronze sprite, Arielulus circumdatus
Coppery sprite, Arielulus cuprosus
Social sprite, Arielulus societatis
Genus Eptesicus – house bats
 Anatolian serotine, Eptesicus anatolicus 
 Little black serotine, Eptesicus andinus 
 Bobrinski's serotine, Eptesicus bobrinskoi 
 Botta's serotine, Eptesicus bottae 
 Brazilian brown bat, Eptesicus brasiliensis 
 Chiriquinan serotine, Eptesicus chiriquinus 
 Diminutive serotine, Eptesicus diminutus 
 Horn-skinned bat, Eptesicus floweri 
 Argentine brown bat, Eptesicus furinalis 
 Big brown bat, Eptesicus fuscus 
 Gobi big brown bat, Eptesicus gobiensis 
 Guadeloupe big brown bat, Eptesicus guadeloupensis 
 Long-tailed house bat, Eptesicus hottentotus 
 Harmless serotine, Eptesicus innoxius 
 Meridional serotine, Eptesicus isabellinus 
 Japanese short-tailed bat, Eptesicus japonensis 
 Kobayashi's bat, Eptesicus kobayashii 
 Langer's serotine, Eptesicus langeri 
 Eptesicus lobatus
 Northern bat, Eptesicus nilssonii 
 Ognev's serotine, Eptesicus ognevi 
Orinoco serotine, Eptesicus orinocensis 
 Oriental serotine, Eptesicus pachyomus 
 Thick-eared bat, Eptesicus pachyotis 
 Lagos serotine, Eptesicus platyops 
 Serotine bat, Eptesicus serotinus 
 Taddei's serotine, Eptesicus taddeii 
 Sombre bat, Eptesicus tatei 
 Ulapes serotine, Eptesicus ulapesensis 
Genus Glauconycteris – butterfly bats
Allen's striped bat, Glauconycteris alboguttata
Silvered bat, Glauconycteris argentata
Blackish butterfly bat, Glauconycteris atra
Beatrix's bat, Glauconycteris beatrix
Curry's bat, Glauconycteris curryae
Bibundi bat, Glauconycteris egeria
Glen's wattled bat, Glauconycteris gleni
Allen's spotted bat, Glauconycteris humeralis
Kenyan wattled bat, Glauconycteris kenyacola
Machado's butterfly bat, Glauconycteris machadoi
Abo bat, Glauconycteris poensis
Pied butterfly bat, Glauconycteris superba
Variegated butterfly bat, Glauconycteris variegata
Genus Hesperoptenus – false serotine bats
Blanford's bat, Hesperoptenus blanfordi
False serotine bat, Hesperoptenus doriae
Gaskell's false serotine, Hesperoptenus gaskelli
Tickell's bat, Hesperoptenus tickelli
Large false serotine, Hesperoptenus tomesi
Genus Histiotus – big-eared brown bats
Strange big-eared brown bat, Histiotus alienus
Cadena-García's big-eared brown bat, Histiotus cadenai
Colombian big-eared brown bat, Histiotus colombiae
Transparent-winged big-eared brown bat, Histiotus diaphanopterus
Humboldt big-eared brown bat, Histiotus humboldti
Thomas's big-eared brown bat, Histiotus laephotis
Big-eared brown bat, Histiotus macrotus
Southern big-eared brown bat, Histiotus magellanicus
Moche big-eared brown bat, Histiotus mochica
Small big-eared brown bat, Histiotus montanus
Tropical big-eared brown bat, Histiotus velatus
Genus Ia
Great evening bat, Ia io
Genus Lasionycteris
Silver-haired bat, Lasionycteris noctivagans
Genus Scoteanax
Rüppell's broad-nosed bat, Scoteanax rueppellii
Genus Scotomanes
Harlequin bat, Scotomanes ornatus
Genus Scotorepens - lesser broad-nosed bats
Inland broad-nosed bat, Scotorepens balstoni
Little broad-nosed bat, Scotorepens greyii
Eastern broad-nosed bat, Scotorepens orion
Northern broad-nosed bat, Scotorepens sanborni
Genus Thainycteris 
Collared sprite, Thainycteris aureocollaris
Necklace sprite, Thainycteris torquatus
Tribe incertae sedis
Genus Rhyneptesicus
Sind bat, Rhyneptesicus nasutus
Tribe Lasiurini
Genus Aeorestes – hoary bats
Hoary bat, Aeorestes cinereus
Big red bat, Aeorestes egregius
Hawaiian hoary bat, Aeorestes semotus
South American hoary bat, Aeorestes villosissimus
Genus Dasypterus – yellow bats
Southern yellow bat, Dasypterus ega
Cuban yellow bat, Dasypterus insularis
Northern yellow bat, Dasypterus intermedius
Western yellow bat, Dasypterus xanthinus
Genus Lasiurus – red or hairy-tailed bats
Arequipa red bat, Lasiurus arequipae
Greater red bat, Lasiurus atratus
Southern red bat, Lasiurus blossevillii
Eastern red bat, Lasiurus borealis
Tacarcuna bat, Lasiurus castaneus
Jamaican red bat, Lasiurus degelidus
Hairy-tailed bat, Lasiurus ebenus
Western red bat, Lasiurus frantzii
Minor red bat, Lasiurus minor
Pfeiffer's red bat, Lasiurus pfeifferi
Seminole bat, Lasiurus seminolus
Cinnamon red bat, Lasiurus varius
Tribe Nycticeiini
Genus Nycticeius – evening bats
Temminck's mysterious bat, Nycticeius aenobarbus
Evening bat, Nycticeius humeralis
Cuban evening bat, Nycticeius cubanus
Tribe Perimyotini
Genus Parastrellus
Canyon bat, Parastrellus hesperus
Genus Perimyotis
Tricolored bat, Perimyotis subflavus
Tribe Pipistrellini
Genus Glischropus – thick-thumbed bats
Dark thick-thumbed bat, Glischropus aquilus
Indochinese thick-thumbed bat, Glischropus bucephalus
Javan thick-thumbed bat, Glischropus javanus
Common thick-thumbed bat, Glischropus tylopus
Genus Nyctalus – noctule bats
Birdlike noctule, Nyctalus aviator
Azores noctule, Nyctalus azoreum
Japanese noctule, Nyctalus furvus
Greater noctule bat, Nyctalus lasiopterus
Lesser noctule, Nyctalus leisleri
Mountain noctule, Nyctalus montanus
Common noctule, Nyctalus noctula
Chinese noctule, Nyctalus plancyi
Genus Pipistrellus – Pipistrelles or Pipistrelle bats
Japanese pipistrelle, Pipistrellus abramus
Forest pipistrelle, Pipistrellus adamsi
Mount Gargues pipistrelle, Pipistrellus aero
Angulate pipistrelle, Pipistrellus angulatus
Kelaart's pipistrelle, Pipistrellus ceylonicus
Greater Papuan pipistrelle, Pipistrellus collinus
Indian pipistrelle, Pipistrellus coromandra
Crete pipistrelle, Pipistrellus creticus
Dhofar pipistrelle, Pipistrellus dhofarensis
Endo's pipistrelle, Pipistrellus endoi
Hanaki's dwarf bat, Pipistrellus hanaki
Dusky pipistrelle, Pipistrellus hesperidus
Aellen's pipistrelle, Pipistrellus inexspectatus
Java pipistrelle, Pipistrellus javanicus
Kuhl's pipistrelle, Pipistrellus kuhlii
Madeira pipistrelle, Pipistrellus maderensis
Minahassa pipistrelle, Pipistrellus minahassae
†Christmas Island pipistrelle, Pipistrellus murrayi
Tiny pipistrelle, Pipistrellus nanulus
Nathusius's pipistrelle, Pipistrellus nathusii
Lesser Papuan pipistrelle, Pipistrellus papuanus
Mount Popa pipistrelle, Pipistrellus paterculus
Dar es Salaam pipistrelle, Pipistrellus permixtus
Common pipistrelle, Pipistrellus pipistrellus
Soprano pipistrelle, Pipistrellus pygmaeus
Rusty pipistrelle, Pipistrellus rusticus
Simandou pipistrelle, Pipistrellus simandouensis
Narrow-winged pipistrelle, Pipistrellus stenopterus
†Sturdee's pipistrelle, Pipistrellus sturdeei
Least pipistrelle, Pipistrellus tenuis
Watts's pipistrelle, Pipistrellus wattsi
Northern pipistrelle, Pipistrellus westralis
Genus Scotoecus - house bats
White-bellied lesser house bat, Scotoecus albigula
Light-winged lesser house bat, Scotoecus albofuscus
Hinde's lesser house bat, Scotoecus hindei
Dark-winged lesser house bat, Scotoecus hirundo
Desert yellow bat, Scotoecus pallidus
Genus Scotozous
Dormer's bat, Scotozous dormeri
Genus Vansonia
Rüppell's bat, Vansonia rueppellii
Tribe Plecotini
Genus Barbastella – barbastelles or barbastelle bats
Western barbastelle, Barbastella barbastellus
Beijing barbastelle, Barbastella beijingensis
Caspian barbastelle, Barbastella caspica
Eastern barbastelle or Asian barbastelle, Barbastella darjelingensis
Arabian barbastelle, Barbastella leucomelas
Japanese barbastelle, Barbastella pacifica
Genus Corynorhinus – American lump-nosed bats
Rafinesque's big-eared bat, Corynorhinus rafinesquii
Mexican big-eared bat, Corynorhinus mexicanus
Townsend's big-eared bat, Corynorhinus townsendii
Genus Euderma
Spotted bat, Euderma maculatum
Genus Idionycteris
Allen's big-eared bat, Idionycteris phyllotis
Genus Otonycteris
Desert long-eared bat, Otonycteris hemprichii
Turkestani long-eared bat, Otonycteris leucophaea
Genus Plecotus – lump-nosed bats
Brown long-eared bat, Plecotus auritus
Grey long-eared bat, Plecotus austriacus
Ethiopian long-eared bat, Plecotus balensis
Christie's long-eared bat, Plecotus christii
Gaisler's long-eared bat, Plecotus gaisleri
Himalayan long-eared bat, Plecotus homochrous
Mediterranean long-eared bat, Plecotus kolombatovici
Kozlov's long-eared bat, Plecotus kozlovi
Alpine long-eared bat, Plecotus macrobullaris
 Ognev's long-eared bat Plecotus ognevi
 Japanese long-eared bat, Plecotus sacrimontis
 Sardinian long-eared bat, Plecotus sardus
 Strelkov's long-eared bat, Plecotus strelkovi
Taiwan long-eared bat, Plecotus taivanus
Canary long-eared bat, Plecotus teneriffae
Turkmen long-eared bat, Plecotus turkmenicus
Ward's long-eared bat, Plecotus wardi
Tribe Scotophilini
Genus Scotophilus – Old World yellow bats
East African yellow bat, Scotophilus altilis
Andrew Rebori's house bat, Scotophilus andrewreborii
Lesser yellow bat, Scotophilus borbonicus
Sulawesi yellow bat, Scotophilus celebensis
Eritrean yellow bat, Scotophilus colias
Sody's yellow bat, Scotophilus collinus
African yellow bat, Scotophilus dinganii
Ejeta's yellow bat, Scotophilus ejetai
Greater Asiatic yellow bat, Scotophilus heathi
Lesser Asiatic yellow bat, Scotophilus kuhlii
White-bellied yellow bat, Scotophilus leucogaster
Livingstone's yellow bat, Scotophilus livingstonii
Marovaza yellow bat, Scotophilus marovaza
Schreber's yellow bat, Scotophilus nigrita
Western greenish yellow bat, Scotophilus nigritellus
Robbins's yellow bat, Scotophilus nucellaNut-colored yellow bat, Scotophilus nux
Robust yellow bat, Scotophilus robustus
Malagasy yellow bat, Scotophilus tandrefana
Trujillo's yellow bat, Scotophilus trujilloi
Eastern greenish yellow bat, Scotophilus viridisTribe Vespertilionini'''
Genus AfronycterisHeller's serotine, Afronycteris heliosBanana serotine, Afronycteris nanusGenus Cassistrellus – helmeted bats
Surat helmeted bat, Cassistrellus dimissusYok Don helmeted bat, Cassistrellus yokdonensisGenus Chalinolobus – wattled bats
Large-eared pied bat, Chalinolobus dwyeriGould's wattled bat, Chalinolobus gouldiiChocolate wattled bat, Chalinolobus morioNew Caledonian wattled bat, Chalinolobus neocaledonicus 
Hoary wattled bat, Chalinolobus nigrogriseusLittle pied bat, Chalinolobus picatusNew Zealand long-tailed bat or long-tailed wattled bat, Chalinolobus tuberculatusGenus Falsistrellus – false pipistrelles
Western false pipistrelle, Falsistrellus mackenzieiEastern false pipistrelle, Falsistrellus tasmaniensisGenus Hypsugo – Asian pipistrelles
Chocolate pipistrelle, Hypsugo affinisAlashanian pipistrelle, Hypsugo alaschanicusArabian pipistrelle, Hypsugo arabicusDesert pipistrelle, Hypsugo arielBodenheimer's pipistrelle, Hypsugo bodenheimeriCadorna's pipistrelle, Hypsugo cadornaeLong-toothed pipistrelle, Hypsugo dolichodonBrown pipistrelle, Hypsugo imbricatusRed-brown pipistrelle, Hypsugo kitcheneriSocotran pipistrelle or Lanza's pipistrelle, Hypsugo lanzaiBurma pipistrelle, Hypsugo lophurusBig-eared pipistrelle, Hypsugo macrotisPungent pipistrelle, Hypsugo mordaxMouselike pipistrelle, Hypsugo musciculusPeters's pipistrelle, Hypsugo petersiChinese pipistrelle, Hypsugo pulveratusSavi's pipistrelle, Hypsugo saviiVordermann's pipistrelle, Hypsugo vordermanniGenus Laephotis – long-eared bats
Angolan long-eared bat, Laephotis angolensisBotswanan long-eared bat, Laephotis botswanaeCape serotine, Laeophotis capensisEast African serotine, Laephotis kirinyagaIsalo serotine, Laephotis malagasyensisMalagasy serotine, Laephotis matrokaNamib long-eared bat, Laephotis namibensisRoberts's serotine, Laephotis robertsiStanley's serotine, Laephotis stanleyiDe Winton's long-eared bat, Laephotis wintoniGenus MimetillusMoloney's mimic bat, Mimetillus moloneyiThomas's mimic bat, Mimetillus thomasiGenus MirostrellusJoffre's bat, Mirostrellus joffreiGenus NeoromiciaAnchieta's serotine, Neoromicia anchietae 
Kirindy serotine, Neoromicia bemaintyYellow serotine, Neoromicia flavescensTiny serotine, Neoromicia guineensisMelck's house bat, Neoromicia melckorumSomali serotine, Neoromicia somalicaZulu serotine, Neoromicia zuluensisGenus NycticeinopsBellier's serotine, Nycticeinops bellieriBroad-headed serotine, Nycticeinops crassulusEisentraut's serotine, Nycticeinops eisentrautiGrandidier's serotine, Nycticeinops grandidieriHappolds's serotine, Nycticeinops happoldorumLarge-headed serotine, Nycticeinops macrocephalusSchlieffen's serotine, Nycticeinops schlieffeniGenus Nyctophilus – New Guinean and Australian big-eared bats
Northern long-eared bat, Nyctophilus arnhemensisEastern long-eared bat, Nyctophilus bifaxSouth-eastern long-eared bat, Nyctophilus corbeniPallid long-eared bat, Nyctophilus daedalusLesser long-eared bat, Nyctophilus geoffroyiGould's long-eared bat, Nyctophilus gouldiSunda long-eared bat, Nyctophilus heran†Lord Howe long-eared bat, Nyctophilus howensisHolt's long-eared bat, Nyctophilus holtorumSmall-toothed long-eared bat, Nyctophilus microdonNew Guinea long-eared bat, Nyctophilus microtisNew Caledonian long-eared bat, Nyctophilus nebulosusGreater long-eared bat, Nyctophilus timoriensisWestern long-eared bat, Nyctophilus majorTasmanian long-eared bat, Nyctophilus sherriniMt. Missim long-eared bat, Nyctophilus shirleyaePygmy long-eared bat, Nyctophilus walkeriGenus PharotisNew Guinea big-eared bat, Pharotis imogeneGenus PhiletorRohu's bat, Philetor brachypterusGenus PseudoromiciaDark-brown serotine, Pseudoromicia brunneaIsabelline serotine, Pseudoromicia isabellaKityo's serotine, Pseudoromicia kityoiNyanza serotine, Pseudoromicia nyanzaRendall's serotine, Pseudoromicia rendalliRosevear's serotine, Pseudoromicia roseveariWhite-winged serotine, Pseudoromicia tenuipinnisGenus Tylonycteris – bamboo bats
Amber bamboo bat, Tylonycteris fulvidaMalayan bamboo bat, Tylonycteris malayanaLesser bamboo bat, Tylonycteris pachypusPygmy bamboo bat, Tylonycteris pygmaeusGreater bamboo bat, Tylonycteris robustulaTonkin bamboo bat, Tylonycteris tonkinensisGenus VespadelusInland forest bat, Vespadelus baverstockiNorthern cave bat, Vespadelus caurinusLarge forest bat, Vespadelus darlingtoniYellow-lipped bat, Vespadelus douglasorumFinlayson's cave bat, Vespadelus finlaysoniEastern forest bat, Vespadelus pumilusSouthern forest bat, Vespadelus regulusTroughton's forest bat, Vespadelus troughtoniLittle forest bat, Vespadelus vulturnusGenus Vespertilio – frosted bats
Parti-coloured bat, Vespertilio murinusAsian parti-colored bat, Vespertilio sinensis''

References

Vesper bats
Mammal subfamilies
Taxa named by John Edward Gray
Bat taxonomy